Choi Gee-sung (born 2 February 1951) is President and Chief Executive of the digital media division at Samsung Electronics, overseeing the third-largest business group of the South Korean company, which includes televisions, flat-panel screens, MP3 players, personal computers, and other consumer electronics. He was a New York City torchbearer for the 2004 Summer Olympics relay.

Early life
Choi grew up in Chuncheon, Gangwon-do, where he attended Chuncheon Middle School and Chuncheon High School. He graduated from Seoul National University's Department of Business in 1977.

Career
Choi had a stint as chief design officer and established Samsung's chip business in Europe in the 1980s. He is best known as a marketing expert, however, and is credited with having steered Samsung past Sony (SNE) to become the world's No. 1 TV brand in 2006. Choi took over the running of Samsung's mobile phone business in January 2007. By September 2008, the company's global market share stood at 17.1%—second only to Nokia and up from 14.4% in 2007.

References

1951 births
Living people
People from Chuncheon
Samsung people
Seoul National University alumni
South Korean chief executives